Vilhelm Vett (31 December 1879 – 3 December 1962) was a Danish sailor who competed in the 1924 Summer Olympics and in the 1928 Summer Olympics. In 1924 he won the silver medal as crew member of the Danish boat Bonzo in the 6 metre class event. Four years later he won his second silver medal, this time as part of the Danish boat Hi-Hi in the 6 metre class competition.

References

External links
 
 
 

1879 births
1962 deaths
Danish male sailors (sport)
Olympic sailors of Denmark
Olympic silver medalists for Denmark
Olympic medalists in sailing
Sailors at the 1924 Summer Olympics – 6 Metre
Sailors at the 1928 Summer Olympics – 6 Metre
Medalists at the 1928 Summer Olympics
Medalists at the 1924 Summer Olympics